The Ricards House–Linden Hall near Bridgeville, Delaware, USA, also known as Conaway House, is a historic house that was builtin five sections between 1731 and the mid-1960s.  It includes a distinctive two story veranda built in the 1850s in the style of a pre-Civil War plantation house.

The house was listed on the National Register of Historic Places in 1982.

The architecture includes Classical Revival, Federal, and Colonial Vernacular styles.

References

Houses on the National Register of Historic Places in Delaware
Federal architecture in Delaware
Neoclassical architecture in Delaware
Houses in Sussex County, Delaware
National Register of Historic Places in Sussex County, Delaware